Yang Chen-Ning or Chen-Ning Yang (born 1 October 1922), also known as C. N. Yang or by the English name Frank Yang, is a Chinese theoretical physicist who made significant contributions to statistical mechanics, integrable systems, gauge theory, and both particle physics and condensed matter physics. He and Tsung-Dao Lee received the 1957 Nobel Prize in Physics for their work on parity non-conservation of weak interaction. The two proposed that one of the basic quantum-mechanics laws, the conservation of parity, is violated in the so-called weak nuclear reactions, those nuclear processes that result in the emission of beta or alpha particles. Yang is also well known for his collaboration with Robert Mills in developing non-abelian gauge theory, widely known as the Yang–Mills theory.

Early life and education 
Yang was born in Hefei, Anhui, China. His father,  (1896–1973), was a mathematician, and his mother, Meng Hwa Loh Yang, was a housewife. 

Yang attended elementary school and high school in Beijing, and in the autumn of 1937 his family moved to Hefei after the Japanese invaded China. In 1938 they moved to Kunming, Yunnan, where National Southwestern Associated University was located. In the same year, as a second year student, Yang passed the entrance examination and studied at National Southwestern Associated University. He received a Bachelor of Science in 1942, with his thesis on the application of group theory to molecular spectra, under the supervision of Ta-You Wu. 

Yang continued to study graduate courses there for two years under the supervision of Wang Zhuxi, working on statistical mechanics. In 1944 he received a Master of Science from Tsinghua University, which had moved to Kunming during the Sino-Japanese War (1937–1945). Yang was then awarded a scholarship from the Boxer Indemnity Scholarship Program, set up by the United States government using part of the money China had been forced to pay following the Boxer Rebellion. His departure for the United States was delayed for one year, during which time he taught in a middle school as a teacher and studied field theory.

Yang entered the University of Chicago in January 1946 and studied with Edward Teller. He received a Doctor of Philosophy in 1948.

Career 
Yang remained at the University of Chicago for a year as an assistant to Enrico Fermi. In 1949 he was invited to do his research at the Institute for Advanced Study in Princeton, New Jersey, where he began a period of fruitful collaboration with Tsung-Dao Lee.  He was made a permanent member of the Institute in 1952, and full professor in 1955. In 1963, Princeton University Press published his textbook, Elementary Particles.  In 1965 he moved to Stony Brook University, where he was named the Albert Einstein Professor of Physics and the first director of the newly founded Institute for Theoretical Physics. Today this institute is known as the C. N. Yang Institute for Theoretical Physics.

Yang retired from Stony Brook University in 1999, assuming the title Emeritus Professor. In 2010, Stony Brook University honored Yang's contributions to the university by naming its newest dormitory building C. N. Yang Hall.

Yang has been elected a Fellow of the American Physical Society, the Chinese Academy of Sciences, the Academia Sinica, the Russian Academy of Sciences, and the Royal Society. He was an elected member of the American Academy of Arts and Sciences, the American Philosophical Society, and the United States National Academy of Sciences. He was awarded honorary doctorate degrees by Princeton University (1958), Moscow State University (1992), and the Chinese University of Hong Kong (1997).

Yang visited the Chinese mainland in 1971 for the first time after the thaw in China–US relations, and has subsequently worked to help the Chinese physics community rebuild the research atmosphere which was destroyed by the radical political movements during the Cultural Revolution. After retiring from Stony Brook he returned as an honorary director of Tsinghua University, Beijing, where he is the Huang Jibei-Lu Kaiqun Professor at the Center for Advanced Study (CASTU). He is also one of the two Shaw Prize Founding Members and is a Distinguished Professor-at-Large at the Chinese University of Hong Kong.

Personal life 
Yang married Chih-li Tu, a teacher, in 1950 and has two sons and a daughter with her: Franklin Jr., Gilbert and Eulee. His father-in-law was the Kuomintang general Du Yuming. Some scholars suspect that Du was promoted to a high-ranking position in the Chinese People's Political Consultative Conference in order to convince Yang to return to China after seeking refuge in the US. Tu died in October 2003, and in December 2004 the then 82-year-old Yang caused a stir by marrying the then 28-year-old Weng Fan, calling Weng the "final blessing from God". Yang formally renounced his U.S. citizenship in late 2015. On 1 October 2022, Yang became a centenarian.

Academic achievements 

Yang has worked on statistical mechanics, condensed matter theory, particle physics and gauge theory/quantum field theory.

At the University of Chicago, Yang first spent twenty months working in an accelerator lab, but he later found he was not as good as an experimentalist and switched back to theory. His doctoral thesis was about angular distribution in nuclear reactions. Later he worked on particle phenomenology; a well-known work was the Fermi–Yang model treating pion meson as a bound nucleon–anti-nucleon pair. In 1956, he and Tsung Dao (T.D.) Lee proposed that in the weak interaction the parity symmetry was not conserved, Chien-shiung Wu's team at the National Bureau of Standards in Washington experimentally verified the theory. Yang and Lee received the 1957 Nobel Prize in Physics for their parity violation theory, which brought revolutionary change to the field of particle physics. Yang has also worked on neutrino theory with Tsung Dao (T.D.) Lee, 1957, 1959, CT nonconservation (with Tsung Dao (T.D.) Lee and R. Oheme, 1957), electromagnetic interaction of vector mesons (with Tsung Dao (T.D.) Lee, 1962), CP nonconservation with Tai Tsun Wu (1964).

Yang is also well known for his collaboration with Robert Mills in developing non-abelian gauge theory, widely known as the Yang–Mills theory. Subsequently, in the last three decades, many other prominent scientists have developed key breakthroughs to what is now known as gauge theory.  In the 1970s Yang worked on the topological properties of gauge theory, collaborating with Wu Tai-Tsun to elucidate the Wu–Yang monopole. Unlike the Dirac monopole, it has no singular Dirac string. Also devised the Wu–Yang dictionary, the Yang-Mills theory set the template for the Standard Model and modern physics in general, as well as the work towards a Grand Unified Theory; it was called by The Scientist, "the foundation for current understanding of how subatomic particles interact, a contribution which has restructured modern physics and mathematics." The idea was generally conceived by Yang, and the novice scientist Mills assisted him in this endeavor as Mills said,"During the academic year 1953-1954, Yang was a visitor to Brookhaven National Laboratory...I was at Brookhaven also...and was assigned to the same office as Yang. Yang, who has demonstrated on a number of occasions his generosity to physicists beginning their careers, told me about his idea of generalizing gauge invariance and we discussed it at some length...I was able to contribute something to the discussions, especially with regard to the quantization procedures, and to a small degree in working out the formalism; however, the key ideas were Yang's."

Yang has had a great interest in statistical mechanics since his undergraduate time. In the 1950s and 1960s, he collaborated with Tsung Dao (T.D.) Lee and Kerson Huang, etc. and studied statistical mechanics and condensed matter theory. He studied the theory of phase transition and elucidated the Lee–Yang circle theorem, properties of quantum boson liquid, two dimensional Ising model, flux quantization in superconductors (with N. Byers, 1961), and proposed the concept of Off-Diagonal Long-Range Order (ODLRO, 1962). In 1967, he found a consistent condition for a one dimensional factorized scattering many body system, the equation was later named the Yang–Baxter equation, it plays an important role in integrable models and has influenced several branches of physics and mathematics.

Awards and honors

 Nobel Prize in Physics (1957)
 Ten Outstanding Young Americans (1957)
 Rumford Prize (1980) 
 National Medal of Science (1986)
 Oskar Klein Memorial Lecture and Medal (1988)
 Benjamin Franklin Medal for Distinguished Achievement in the Sciences of the American Philosophical Society (1993)
 Bower Award (1994)
 Albert Einstein Medal (1995)
 Lars Onsager Prize (1999)
 King Faisal International Prize (2001)
 C.N. Yang Hall, a residence hall and activity center at Stony Brook University, was dedicated in 2010.

Selected publications  
 Collected works
 
 
 

 Yang–Mills theory
 
 
 

 Parity violation
 

 Lee–Yang theorem
 

 Byers–Yang theorem

See also 
 Yang–Mills theory
 Wu–Yang monopole
 Yang–Baxter equation
 Yangian
 Parity violation
 Wu experiment
 Lee–Yang theorem
 Byers–Yang theorem
 C. N. Yang Institute for Theoretical Physics
 Center for Advanced Study, Tsinghua University 
 List of Chinese Nobel laureates
 List of theoretical physicists

Bibliography 

 Interpretation of Organic Spectra, Wiley, 2011

References

Citations

Sources 

 
 Lee, T. D. and Yang, C. N. "Elementary Particles and Weak Interactions", Brookhaven National Laboratory (BNL), United States Department of Energy (through predecessor agency the Atomic Energy Commission), (1957).
 Yang, C. N. "The Many Body Problem. Physics Monographs No. 6," Rio de Janeiro. Centro Brasileiro de Pesquisas Fisicas, (1960).
 
 Yang, C. N. "Mathematical Deductions from Some Rules Concerning High-Energy Total Cross Sections," Brookhaven National Laboratory (BNL), United States Department of Energy (through predecessor agency the Atomic Energy Commission), (1962).
 Yang, C. N. "Symmetry Principles In Physics. Brookhaven Lecture Series Number 50," Brookhaven National Laboratory (BNL), United States Department of Energy (through predecessor agency the Atomic Energy Commission), (13 October 1965).

External links 
 
 
 Professor Chen Ning Yang (homepage – Institute for Advanced Study, Tsinghua University)
 Chen Ning Yang (homepage – Stony Brook University)
 C.N. Yang's Home Page (homepage – The Chinese University of Hong Kong)
  including the Nobel Lecture, 11 December 1957 The Law of Parity Conservation and Other Symmetry Laws of Physics
 The Shaw Prize, Structure  (homepage – Shaw Prize)
 Symmetries and Reflections (C.N. Yang retirement symposium at Stony Brook University)
 The CN Yang Scholars Programme  at Nanyang Technological University , Singapore
 

1922 births
Living people
21st-century American physicists
Albert Einstein Medal recipients
American agnostics
American emigrants to China
American Nobel laureates
Boxer Indemnity Scholarship recipients
Brookhaven National Laboratory Nobel laureates
Chinese agnostics
Chinese emigrants to the United States
Donegall Lecturers of Mathematics at Trinity College Dublin
Fellows of the American Association for the Advancement of Science
Fellows of the American Physical Society
Foreign associates of the National Academy of Sciences
Foreign Members of the Royal Society
Foreign Members of the Russian Academy of Sciences
Institute for Advanced Study faculty
Members of Academia Sinica
Members of the Chinese Academy of Sciences
Members of the Pontifical Academy of Sciences
Nankai University alumni
National Medal of Science laureates
National Southwestern Associated University alumni
Naturalized citizens of the People's Republic of China
Nobel laureates in Physics
Nobel laureates of the People's Republic of China
Nobel laureates of the Republic of China
Particle physicists
People from Hefei
Former United States citizens
People with acquired American citizenship
Physicists from Anhui
Stony Brook University faculty
Theoretical physicists
Tsinghua University alumni
Academic staff of Tsinghua University
University of Chicago alumni
Chinese centenarians
Men centenarians
Members of the American Philosophical Society